Birmingham Women's Hospital is a women's hospital which is located directly opposite The Queen Elizabeth Hospital in Birmingham, England. It is managed by Birmingham Women's and Children's NHS Foundation Trust.

History
The first Birmingham maternity hospital was established in 1842 to reduce the number of women and children dying needlessly from puerperal fever and childbirth related infections. The Birmingham and Midland Hospital for Women was established with eight beds at Showell Green in Sparkhill in 1871. It moved to a converted farmhouse on the Stratford Road in 1878, to a purpose-built facility on Showell Green Lane in 1905 and then to the current modern facility in Edgbaston in 1968. Work on a new gynaecology unit and expanded maternity unit started in February 2015.

See also
 List of hospitals in England
 Healthcare in West Midlands

References

External links
 Birmingham Women's and Children's NHS Foundation Trust
 

Hospitals in Birmingham, West Midlands
NHS hospitals in England
Hospital buildings completed in 1968
Hospitals established in 1871
1871 establishments in England
Women's hospitals